Bavayia pulchella , also known as the pretty bavayia, is a species of geckos endemic to Grande Terre in New Caledonia.

The species name, pulchella, is a diminutive of the Latin for "beautiful", and according to the  species description "refers to both the small size of this species and the complex and attractive dorsal pattern exhibited by most specimens, including the holotype."

References

Bavayia
Reptiles described in 1998
Taxa named by Aaron M. Bauer
Taxa named by Anthony Whitaker
Taxa named by Ross Allen Sadlier
Geckos of New Caledonia